Dunlop v R, [1979] 2 S.C.R. 881 is the leading decision of the Supreme Court of Canada on participating in a criminal act by aiding and abetting. The Court held that the mere presence of the accused at the scene of a criminal act is not sufficient to convict the person for aiding and abetting a criminal act. There must be something more.

Background
Two teenagers, Dunlop and Sylvester, were members of a motorcycle club. One evening they went to a party held by the club where other members were involved in a gang rape of a teenage girl.

The girl testified at trial that the two teens had participated in the rape. The trial judge directed the jury to find whether the teens had participated enough to have aided or abetted the rape under section 21(1) of the Criminal Code or had a common intention to rape the victim under section 21(2) of the Criminal Code.

Opinion of the Court
Justice Dickson wrote the decision for the majority. He held that the trial judge had erred in instructing the jury to consider the "common intention" provision of the Criminal Code. The sole issue was whether the teens had aided and abetted the commission of the crime. In considering the provision he held that:
In the case at bar I have great difficulty in finding any evidence of anything more than mere presence and passive acquiescence. Presence at the commission of an offence can be evidence of aiding and abetting if accompanied by other factors, such as prior knowledge of the principal offender's intention to commit the offence or attendance for the purpose of encouragement. There was no evidence that while the crime was being committed either of the accused rendered aid, assistance or encouragement to the rape of Brenda Ross. There was no evidence of any positive act or omission to facilitate the unlawful purpose.

Accordingly, the two teens were acquitted.

See also
 List of Supreme Court of Canada cases (Laskin Court)

Notes

External links
 full text from CanLII.org

Supreme Court of Canada cases
Canadian criminal case law
1979 in Canadian case law